Feinsum is a village in Leeuwarden municipality in the province of Friesland, the Netherlands. It had a population of around 165 in January 2017.

There is a restored windmill, the Slagdijkstermolen.

History
The village was first mentioned in 1335 as Finckum. The etymology is unclear. Feinsum is a very old terp (artificial living mound) village which probably had its origins in the beginning of our era, and has one of the oldest dikes of the Netherlands. There used to be outpost of the monastery  in Feinsum. 

The Dutch Reformed church dates from the 13th century and was restored between 1962 and 1964. In 1840, Feinsum was home to 227 people.

Before 2018, the village was part of the Leeuwarderadeel municipality.

Gallery

References

External links

Leeuwarden
Populated places in Friesland